Arthur Clifford Hartley, CBE (7 January 1889 – 28 January 1960) was a British civil engineer. Graduating with a bachelor's degree from Imperial College London, Hartley worked for the North Eastern Railway and an asphalt manufacturer before joining the Royal Flying Corps during World War I. He became a qualified pilot, with the rank of major and joined the Air Board where he was involved with the development of interrupter gear. His war work was rewarded with his appointment as an Officer of the Order of the British Empire (OBE). He left the corps after the war and spent five years as a consulting engineer before he joined the Anglo-Persian Oil Company (later Anglo-Iranian).

During the Second World War Hartley was seconded to the government where he was involved in the development of the bombsight which sank the Tirpitz, the Operation Pluto pipeline project and the FIDO fog dispersion system. Following the war he was rewarded with an appointment as Commander of the Order of the British Empire (CBE), a United States Medal of Freedom and £9000 cash. He retired from Anglo-Iranian in 1951 and was elected president of the Institution of Mechanical Engineers. He was elected president of the Institution of Civil Engineers in 1959, but died three months into his tenure.

Early life
Hartley was born at Springbank, Hull on 7 January 1889 to George Thomas Hartley, a surgeon, and his wife Elizabeth Briggs. He was educated at Hymers College and Hull Municipal Technical College before attending the City and Guilds College, the engineering department of Imperial College London. He graduated with a third class honours bachelor's degree in engineering in 1910. After graduation he found employment with the North Eastern Railway in the office of their chief docks engineer at Hull and from 1912-14 with asphalt makers Rose, Down and Thompson Limited.

First World War
During the First World War Hartley was commissioned into the Royal Flying Corps as a second lieutenant on 23 August 1916, and became a qualified pilot. He was promoted lieutenant on 22 February 1918. He ended the war with the rank of major. During the war Hartley joined the armaments section of the Air Board, working with Bertram Hopkinson. He was responsible for the Air Board's development of George Constantinescu's interrupter gear which allowed a machine gun to be fired through the propeller blades of an aircraft without danger of damage. This invention was said by Air Vice Marshal Sir John Maitland to be responsible for air superiority over German aircraft. He transferred to the Royal Air Force on its establishment as a separate service. He was appointed an Officer of the Order of the British Empire (OBE) on 10 October 1919 in recognition of his war work.

Interbellum
After the war Hartley worked as a consulting engineer for five years before joining the Anglo-Persian Oil Company in 1924 as assistant manager of its engineering division. He became assistant manager of the supply department later the same year and from 1932 to 1934 he was seconded to the Iraq Petroleum Company, on his return being appointed chief engineer. The company became the Anglo-Iranian Oil Company in 1935.

Second World War

Following the outbreak of the Second World War Hartley was seconded from Anglo-Iranian to the Ministry of Aircraft Production in 1940. From 1940-1 he assisted with the development of a stabilized bombsight which was used by RAF Bomber Command in the sinking of the German battleship Tirpitz in 1944. From 1942 Hartley worked with the Petroleum Warfare Department and was appointed as its technical director. Here he developed, at the request of Air Chief Marshal Arthur Harris, the Fog Investigation and Dispersal Operation which was known as FIDO. This was a means of burning oil along runways to disperse fog. The system was installed at fifteen airfields across Britain, beginning in 1943. FIDO is credited with bringing 2,500 aircraft and 10,000 aircrew safely home during the war.

Hartley also developed the pipes used in Operation Pluto (Pipe Lines Under The Ocean), a series of twenty-one undersea pipes used to transport oil from Britain to continental Europe to support the Liberation of Europe. He also received an appointment as Commander of the Order of the British Empire (CBE) in 1944.

Post-war

Hartley was awarded the United States Medal of Freedom in 1946. He retired from Anglo-Iranian (which would become British Petroleum in 1954) in 1951 and became an engineering consultant during which time he developed the Hartley hoister – a device which allowed the loading of oil tankers offshore. He was elected president of the Institution of Mechanical Engineers in 1951 and was an honorary fellow of the City and Guilds of London Institute. He was also made an honorary fellow of Imperial College London in 1953. In 1959 he received the Redwood Medal of the Institute of Petroleum. He was elected president of the Institution of Civil Engineers in 1959. However he died just three months into his term at St Thomas's Hospital, London on 28 January 1960.

Personal life
Hartley married Dorothy Elizabeth Wallace, the daughter of a Shanghai-based marine engineer, in 1920 and had two sons. Dorothy died in 1923, and in 1927 he married Florence Nina Hodgson with whom he had a further two sons.

References

1889 births
1960 deaths
English civil engineers
Presidents of the Institution of Civil Engineers
Commanders of the Order of the British Empire
Alumni of Imperial College London
British World War I pilots
Royal Flying Corps officers
British Army personnel of World War I
Recipients of the Medal of Freedom
Engineers from Kingston upon Hull
Anglo-Persian Oil Company
BP people